Independent Ukraine (Ukrainian: Самостійна Україна) is a political pamphlet published in 1900 by Mykola Mikhnovsky in support of the Revolutionary Ukrainian Party. It is considered one of the first articulation for a modern, independent Ukrainian state.

References

Further reading
 Mikhnovsky, M. (2016). 21. An Independent Ukraine (excerpt). In R. Lindheim & G. Luckyj (Ed.), Towards an Intellectual History of Ukraine: An Anthology of Ukrainian thought from 1710 to 1995 (pp. 201-215). Toronto: University of Toronto Press. https://doi-org.wikipedialibrary.idm.oclc.org/10.3138/9781442664760-023

External links

 Mikhnovsky, Mykola: Internet Encyclopedia of Ukraine

Ukrainian declarations of independence
1900 in Ukraine